Neeku Nenu Naaku Nuvvu is a 2003 Indian Telugu-language romantic comedy film starring Uday Kiran and Shriya Saran, directed by Raja Sekhar. It is produced by D. Suresh Babu on Suresh Productions banner. Krishnam Raju, Suman, Paruchuri Venkateswara Rao, Ravi Babu, Brahmanandam, Krishna Mohan, Kakarala, Sujatha, Meena Kumari, and Jyothi play supporting roles in this film.

Plot

Raghavayya, a rich industrialist has a daughter (Meena Kumari). Raghavayya helps Prasad who was the son of Raghavayya's deceased employee by funding his studies. Prasad falls in love with Raghavayya's daughter and elopes with her to London and settles there. They have a daughter called Seetu alias Seeta Lakshmi.

Raghavayya adopts a boy from an orphanage and names him Anand. Raghavayya has excessive hatred towards love marriages because of his daughter's elopement. In the meantime, Raghavayya's daughter dies due to illness. After a few years, Prasad and Seetu return to Hyderabad where she meets Anand who is very loyal to his adopted father. Seetu and Anand fall in love.

What happens when Raghavayya learns that his loyal and truthful son is in love with the daughter of those who hurt him forms the crux of the story.

Cast 

 Uday Kiran as Anand
 Shriya Saran as Seeta Lakshmi / Seetu
 Krishnam Raju as Raghavayya
 Suman as Prasad
 Sujatha as Raghavayya's wife
 Meena Kumari as Raghavayya's daughter
 Paruchuri Venkateswara Rao as Raghavayya's friend
 Brahmanandam as Pandit
 Ravi Babu as College student
 Krishna Mohan
 Kakarala
 Jyoti as Thief

Music

Reception 
Jeevi of Idlebrain.com wrote that "The touch of D Suresh Babu is missing in the taking of this film. However, he should be commended for making a clean film". A critic from The Hindu called the film "A moving high-voltage, sentimental drama that caters to family audiences in general".

Awards
51st Filmfare Awards South
Best Supporting Actor – Krishnam Raju – Nominated
Nandi Awards
Akkineni Award for Best Home-viewing Feature Film – D. Suresh Babu

References

External links

2003 films
2000s Telugu-language films
Indian romantic comedy films
2003 romantic comedy films
Suresh Productions films